Grindrod Locomotives is a South African railway locomotive manufacturer tied to the Grindrod company.

Leases 
Headquartered in Pretoria West, a division of the company, Grindrod Rail, owns and leases out over 60 locomotives to various railways.

Timeline

2016 
 Six locomotives ordered by Sitarail, for Ivory Coast and Burkina Faso.
 The order is for 16 locomotives of two types :
 Shunter
 Mainline #CC33201-CC33210.

Types

Notes 
 Note: -DC = Direct Current traction motors.
 Note: -AC = Alternating Current traction motors.
 Note: C- = Cape Gauge (1067mm)
 Note: M- = Metre Gauge (1000mm)
 Note: X= Coupler types are:
 * A = Alliance (American)
 * D = Dual Buffers (British)
 * C = Chopper (Norwegian)
 * S = Single Buffer (German)
 * W = Willison (Russian)
 Note: Engine Makes
 * CAT = Caterpillar
 * GE = General Electric
 Does the axle load include the weight of the fuel?

References 

Locomotive manufacturers of South Africa